The 1979–80 Bradford City A.F.C. season was the 67th in the club's history.

The club finished 5th in Division Four, reached the 3rd round of the FA Cup, and the 2nd round of the League Cup.

Sources

References

Bradford City A.F.C. seasons
Bradford City